James  McCue (born 29 June 1975 in Glasgow) is a Scottish former  footballer who played in the  English and Scottish Football League as a forward.

References

1975 births
Living people
Footballers from Glasgow
Scottish footballers
Association football forwards
West Bromwich Albion F.C. players
Partick Thistle F.C. players
Kidderminster Harriers F.C. players
Hereford United F.C. players
Scottish Football League players
National League (English football) players